KFBK-FM (93.1 MHz) is a commercial radio station licensed to Pollock Pines, California and serving the Sacramento metropolitan area.  It simulcasts KFBK 1530 kHz.  KFBK-AM-FM air a news-talk radio format and are owned by iHeartMedia.  The studios and offices are on River Park Drive in North Sacramento, near the Arden Fair Mall.

KFBK-FM has an effective radiated power (ERP) of 20,500 watts.  The transmitter is on Grizzly Flat Road at Mehwald Lane in Sweeneys Crossing, an unincorporated community in El Dorado County.  KFBK-FM formerly broadcast in the HD Radio hybrid format.  The HD2 subchannel carried the Smooth Jazz service from iHeartRadio.

Programming
iHeart owns three talk stations in the Sacramento metropolitan area, KFBK-AM-FM, which air mostly local shows and news blocks on weekdays, and KSTE 650 AM which carries mostly syndicated conservative talk shows.  Weekdays on KFBK-AM-FM begin with "The KFBK Morning News" with Cristina Mendonsa and Sam Shane, followed by "The Rush Limbaugh Show," Tom Sullivan (originally local, now syndicated via NBC News Radio), John McGinness and "The Afternoon News with Kitty O'Neal."  At night, three syndicated shows are heard: "The Pat Walsh Show," "Coast to Coast AM with George Noory" and "This Morning, America's First News with Gordon Deal."  Limbaugh, syndicated nationally since 1988, was originally a local host on KFBK from 1984 to 1988.

Weekends feature shows on money, health, the outdoors, guns, car repair and travel, some of which are paid brokered programming.  Some weekday shows are repeated on weekends.  ABC News Radio begins most hours nights and weekends.

History
The station signed on the air on August 19, 1976.  It originally was licensed to Susanville as KSUE-FM, broadcasting on 92.7 MHz and powered only at 160 watts, a fraction of its current output.  The station was co-owned with AM 1240 KSUE.  At first it simulcast the AM station but later switched to its own beautiful music format, playing instrumental cover versions of popular songs.  On August 12, 1993, the call sign was changed to KJDX with a country music format.

In 1988, the station moved to 93.3 MHz, coupled with a giant increase in power, to 100,000 watts.  That made it a potential "move-in" station.  If it could be moved closer to Sacramento, it would benefit from being in the more lucrative radio market.

In the summer of 2008, the station's transmitter was relocated closer to Sacramento, coupled with a change in its city of license to Pollock Pines. On November 11, 2008, Sierra Broadcasting swapped call signs and formats between KHJQ, which had moved from 92.3 FM in Susanville to the 93.3 FM frequency vacated by the station, and KJDX. This brought KJDX back to the 93.3 FM frequency in Susanville.

In May 2009, it was announced that new owners Clear Channel Communications (now iHeartMedia) was moving KHJQ's frequency from 93.3 to 93.1 so it wouldn't interfere with the 93.3 frequency in nearby San Francisco. Because of this frequency move, KOSO in Patterson, California (targeting the Modesto area) moved from 93.1 to 92.9 FM on June 1, 2009.

On November 1, 2013, KHLX ended its classic hits format after nearly two years and began playing Christmas music for the holiday season.

On December 19, 2013, Clear Channel announced it would switch its KFBK simulcast from 92.5 to 93.1.  The call letters of KFBK-FM and KHLX would be flipped after the latter finished its holiday music programming on December 26, with the KFBK news/talk simulcast moving to 93.1, while KHLX took over the 92.5 frequency with a country music format.  KHLX has since switched its call letters to KBEB, first airing country music and now carrying a soft adult contemporary format as "The Breeze."

KFBK-HD2
On February 1, 2011, KHLX added a smooth jazz format to its HD2 subchannel.  It filled a void left when Smooth Jazz 94.7 KSSJ switched its format and became KKDO.

References

 Radio & Records Magazine: https://web.archive.org/web/20060707045334/http://www.radioandrecords.com/ (1, 4, 6, 7, 8, 9, 11)
 Mediabase 24/7 Playlist, KGBY-FM: http://www.mmr247.com/mmrweb/allaccess/ (2, 5, 10, 12)
 PAM's Jingles Demo Page: http://jingles.com/jam/radioids/demodl.html (3)

External links
KFBK-FM Website
Sacramento Pride Website

News and talk radio stations in the United States
FBK-FM
Radio stations established in 1976
1976 establishments in California
IHeartMedia radio stations